Fluid feeders are organisms that feed on the fluid of other organisms. It can refer to:

Hematophagy, feeding on blood
Nectarivore, feeding on nectar
Plant sap feeders